10 Paoni - Coptic calendar - 12 Paoni

Fixed commemorations
All fixed commemorations below are observed on 11 Paoni (18 June) by the Coptic Orthodox Church.

Saints
Martyrdom of Saint Claudius Son of Ptolemeus

Commemorations
Consecration of the Altar of the Forty Martyrs of Sebaste at the Savior's Church in Alexandria

References
Coptic Synexarion

Days of the Coptic calendar